Clavulina viridula is a species of coral fungus in the family Clavulinaceae. Originally described from Java as Thelephora viridula by Italian mycologist Giacomo Bresadola in 1907, it was transferred to the genus Clavulina by Derek Reid in 1962.

References

External links

Fungi described in 1907
Fungi of Asia
viridula
Taxa named by Giacomo Bresadola